The Primitives are an English indie pop band from Coventry, best known for their 1988 international hit single "Crash". Formed in 1984, disbanded in 1992 and reformed in 2009, the band's two constant members throughout their recording career have been vocalist Tracy Tracy and guitarist Paul Court. Drummer Tig Williams has been a constant member since 1987. Often described as an indie pop or indie rock band, The Primitives' musical style can also be seen as straddling power pop, new wave and post-punk.

Early career and mainstream success (1986–1992)
The Primitives were formed in the summer of 1984 by PJ Court (born Paul Jonathan Court) (vocals, guitar), Steve Dullaghan (born Stephen Anthony Dullaghan, ex-Nocturnal Babies) (bass), Peter Tweedie (drums) and Keiron McDermott, ex-Nocturnal Babies (vocals). Vocalist McDermott was later replaced by Tracy Tracy (born Tracy Louise Cattell). Tig  Williams replaced Pete Tweedie on drums in October 1987.

McDermott left the band claiming that he could not work with new manager Wayne Morris, and so reformed the Nocturnal Babies. Needing a singer for an upcoming gig, Court wrote on a piece of scrap paper "male singer wanted" and posted it at the Coventry library. Tracy responded that afternoon.

The band were part of the indie music scene of the mid-1980s, alongside bands like The Soup Dragons and The Wedding Present. Their major rivals within the 'blonde pop' scene were Transvision Vamp and The Darling Buds. They received valuable publicity when The Smiths singer Morrissey was photographed wearing a Primitives t-shirt.

The band's early singles were released on their own Lazy Records imprint. In late 1987, they signed the label over to RCA, who released the band's material from then until their split.

The band's first album, Lovely (1988) reached No. 6 on the UK Albums Chart, and produced two top 40 hit singles: "Crash" (UK No. 5, US Modern Rock No. 3) and "Out of Reach" (UK No. 25). "Crash", and the band were described in Melody Maker as "the perfect band who have made the perfect single".

"Way Behind Me" was released as a single soon after, and was included on later versions of the debut album, as well as on the follow-up album Pure. 1988 was the band's peak year; in addition to the hit album and singles, the band undertook a sell-out tour of the UK, ending in two nights in May at London's Town & Country Club.

The band's second album Pure (1989) was preceded by three singles - "Way Behind Me" (UK No. 36, US Modern Rock No. 8), "Sick of It" (UK No. 24, US Modern Rock No. 9) and "Secrets", (UK No. 49, US Modern Rock No. 12).

In 1990, the band co-headlined a tour of the US with the Sugarcubes as well as a short tour of Japan. They split in 1992 following the commercial failure of their 1992 album, Galore.

Reformation (2009–present)
Steve Dullaghan died in Coventry on 4 February 2009, following which, after nearly 18 years of dormancy, The Primitives re-formed, with new bassist Raphael Moore. Their first live shows were in Coventry and at the Buffalo Bar in London in October 2009. In early 2010, The Primitives toured the UK and also performed a single US concert at The Bell House in Brooklyn, New York. The Primitives supported The Wedding Present at Koko in Camden, London on 13 December 2010 as part of that band's Bizarro album 21st anniversary tour.

The Primitives also went back into the studio with original producer Paul Sampson, recording the EP Never Kill a Secret, featuring two original songs - the title track and "Rattle My Cage" - and two cover versions of lesser-known female-fronted songs - "Need All the Help I Can Get" (written by Lee Hazlewood and originally recorded by Suzi Jane Hokom in 1966) and "Breakaway" (originally recorded by Toni Basil in 1966). The EP was released on 7 March 2011. The album Echoes and Rhymes followed in 2012, featuring 14 further recordings of lesser-known female-fronted songs. The Japanese edition of Echoes and Rhymes featured a further three bonus tracks, two of which are remix versions of "Need All the Help I Can Get" and "Breakaway".  The third bonus track "Can't Stop the Want", also featured on the digital EP "Turn Off the Moon".

A new original track featured on the Elefant Records Christmas compilation album A Christmas Gift for You from Elefant Records called "You Trashed My Christmas".  An accompanying video for the track was also released. A compilation album was issued in March 2013 titled Everything's Shining Bright – The Lazy Recordings 1985 – 1987.  The compilation featured all of the Lazy releases, plus, from 1987, previously unreleased, different versions of songs that ended up on Lovely, along with some 1985 demos and the 1987 ICA show, with Morrissey introducing the band on stage.

A new single "Lose the Reason" was released on 18 February 2013, through Elefant Records. The group's fifth studio album, Spin-O-Rama, was released on Elefant on 13 October 2014, and was preceded by the release of the title track as a 7" and download single.

In April 2017, the four song collection, New Thrills, was released. The first 1000 copies were personally autographed by band members. Included with the album was a code and instructions for digital download. Tracks were:
1. "I'll Trust the Wind"
2. "Squeak 'N' Squawk"
3. "Oh Honey Sweet" 
4. "Same Stuff"

The group toured California in June 2017, playing at San Francisco, Los Angeles, and San Diego. In April 2019, The Primitives visited Tokyo, Japan.

Members

Current members
 Paul Court - guitars, vocals (1985–1991, 2009–present)
 Tracy Tracy (aka Tracy Cattell) - vocals (1986–1991, 2009–present)
 Tig Williams - drums (1987–1991, 2009–present)
 Paul Sampson - bass (1989-1991, 2020–present)

Former members
 Steve Dullaghan - bass, guitars (1985–1989; died 2009)
 Peter Tweedie - drums (1985–1987)
 Keiron McDermott - vocals (1985–1986)
 Clive Layton - keyboards (1988–1991)
 Andy Hobson - bass (1989)
 Neil Champion - bass (1991)
 Raph Moore - bass (2009-2019)

Discography

Lovely (1988)
Pure (1989)
Galore (1991)
Echoes and Rhymes (2012)
Spin-O-Rama (2014)
New Thrills (2017)

References

External links
 Primitives Facebook
 YinPop Page
 "Buzz Buzz Buzz: Paul Court of The Primitives" - interview Rocker Magazine 2012

British indie pop groups
English power pop groups
English post-punk music groups
English new wave musical groups
Female-fronted musical groups
Musical groups from Coventry
Musical groups established in 1984
Musical groups disestablished in 1992
Musical groups reestablished in 2009
Elefant Records artists
RCA Records artists